E3 ubiquitin-protein ligase rififylin is an enzyme that in humans is encoded by the RFFL gene.

References

Further reading